Nils Clarke is a Canadian politician, who was elected to the Legislative Assembly of Yukon in the 2016 election. He represents the electoral district of Riverdale North as a member of the Yukon Liberal Party.

Clarke was a lawyer in the Yukon for 24 years, eventually becoming executive director of the Yukon Legal Services Society (Legal Aid). He holds a B.A. from the University of Toronto and an LL.B. from the University of British Columbia. Clarke was admitted to both the Law Society of Upper Canada and the Law Society of Yukon in 1992.

He was elected on November 7, 2016 as part of the election of the Yukon Liberal Party to a majority government. On January 12, 2017, he was sworn in as the 12th Speaker of the Yukon Legislative Assembly. As Speaker, he is also Chair of the Members’ Services Board.

On May 3, 2021, Clarke was named the Minister of Highways and Public Works and the Minister of Environment of Yukon.

Electoral record

2016 general election

|-

|-
!align=left colspan=3|Total
!align=right|1117
!align=right|100.0%
!align=right| –

References

Yukon Liberal Party MLAs
Living people
Politicians from Whitehorse
21st-century Canadian politicians
Speakers of the Yukon Legislative Assembly
Year of birth missing (living people)